Tritia mutabilis, common name : the mutable nassa,  is a species of sea snail, a marine gastropod mollusk in the family Nassariidae, the nassa mud snails or dog whelks.

Description
The size of an adult shell varies between 14 mm and  30 mm.

The smooth shell is ovate, conical, and slightly ventricose. The spire is composed of seven whorls, rounded and swollen at the upper part, especially the lowest, which is larger than all the others united. The three upper whorls are finely plaited. The body whorl has a few fine, transverse striae near the base. The aperture is white and ovate, pretty strongly emarginated, and oblique at the base. The depth of the cavity is chestnut-colored. The thin outer lip is white and very finely striated internally. The inner lip is thin, white and shining and partially covers the body of the shell. The columella arcuated and terminates at the base by a sharp, and slightly projecting keel. The exterior of the shell is red or fawn-colored, ornamented with an articulated band of white and violet upon the upper edge of the whorls, with waved longitudinal yellow or red spots, the tint of which is sometimes very deep, and often very pale.

This shell, which is very common, presents somewhat remarkable varieties of color. Sometimes its ground is red ; and white, undulated, very crowded flames, or brown and distant longitudinal lines ornament it from one end to the other. At other times it is whitish, which happens when it has been a long time exposed to the light ; and in this case transverse striae are perceptible on its surface. But the articulated band about the suture always appears in each of these varieties.

Distribution
This species occurs in the Mediterranean Sea, the Black Sea, in the Atlantic Ocean off Mauritania and West Africa.

References

 Pallary, P. (1910). Sur la faune de l'ancienne lagune de Tunis. Bulletin de la Société d'Histoire Naturelle de l'Afrique du Nord. 1: 214-228
 Coen, G. (1933). Saggio di una Sylloge Molluscorum Adriaticorum. Memorie del Regio Comitato Talassografico Italiano. 192: i-vii, 1-186
 Bernard, P.A. (Ed.) (1984). Coquillages du Gabon [Shells of Gabon]. Pierre A. Bernard: Libreville, Gabon. 140, 75 plates pp.
 Cernohorsky W. O. (1984). Systematics of the family Nassariidae (Mollusca: Gastropoda). Bulletin of the Auckland Institute and Museum 14: 1-356
 Gofas, S.; Le Renard, J.; Bouchet, P. (2001). Mollusca, in: Costello, M.J. et al. (Ed.) (2001). European register of marine species: a check-list of the marine species in Europe and a bibliography of guides to their identification. Collection Patrimoines Naturels, 50: pp. 180–213

External links
 
 Linnaeus, C. (1758). Systema Naturae per regna tria naturae, secundum classes, ordines, genera, species, cum characteribus, differentiis, synonymis, locis. Editio decima, reformata (10th revised edition), vol. 1: 824 pp. Laurentius Salvius: Holmiae
 Gmelin, J. F. (1791). Vermes. In: Gmelin J.F. (Ed.) Caroli a Linnaei Systema Naturae per Regna Tria Naturae, Ed. 13. Tome 1(6). G.E. Beer, Lipsiae (Leipzig) pp. 3021-3910. Systema Naturae. Linneaeus (ed.). Ed. 13. 1: pars. 6
 Bruguière J.G. (1789-1792). Encyclopédie méthodique ou par ordre de matières. Histoire naturelle des vers, volume 1. Paris: Pancoucke. Pp. i-xviii, 1-344 
 Lamarck, [J.-B. M. de. (1822). Histoire naturelle des animaux sans vertèbres. Tome septième. Paris: published by the Author, 711 pp]
 Link, D.H.F. (1807-1808). Beschreibung der Naturalien-Sammlung der Universität zu Rostock. Adlers Erben
 Kiener L.C. (1834-1841). Spécies général et iconographie des coquilles vivantes. Vol. 9. Famille des Purpurifères. Deuxième partie. Genres Colombelle, (Columbella), Lamarck, pp. 1-63, pl. 1-16
  Gray, J. E. (1850). (text). In: Gray, M. E., Figures of molluscous animals, selected from various authors. Longman, Brown, Green and Longmans, London. Vol. 4, iv + 219 pp. (August) [Frontispiece (portrait of Mrs. Gray); pp. ii–iv (preface); 1–62 (explanation of plates 1–312 in Volumes 1–3); pp. 63–124 (systematic arrangement of figures); 127–219 (reprint of Gray 1847)
 Peyrot A. (1925-1928). Conchologie néogénique de l'Aquitaine. Actes de la Société Linnéenne de Bordeaux. 77(2): 51-194
 Risso, A. (1826-1827). Histoire naturelle des principales productions de l'Europe Méridionale et particulièrement de celles des environs de Nice et des Alpes Maritimes. Paris, F.G. Levrault. 3(XVI): 1-480, 14 pls.
 Locard, A. (1886). Prodrome de malacologie française. Catalogue général des mollusques vivants de France. Mollusques marins. Lyon: H. Georg & Paris: Baillière. x + 778 pp
 Pallary, P. (1900). Coquilles marines du littoral du département d'Oran. Journal de Conchyliologie. 48(3): 211-422
 Pallary, P. (1900). Coquilles marines du littoral du département d'Oran. Journal de Conchyliologie. 48(3): 211-422
 Galindo, L. A.; Puillandre, N.; Utge, J.; Lozouet, P.; Bouchet, P. (2016). The phylogeny and systematics of the Nassariidae revisited (Gastropoda, Buccinoidea). Molecular Phylogenetics and Evolution. 99: 337-353

mutabilis
Gastropods described in 1758
Taxa named by Carl Linnaeus